Heart Strings is an album by British singer-songwriter Linda Lewis. It was her last album with Reprise Records.

This album is essentially a compilation which includes tracks from her first three solo records Reprise label releases and also includes three tracks that were only otherwise available on singles: "Safe and Sound," "Sideway Shuffle"  and "Rock a Doodle Do". The record was released following Lewis' departure to Arista Records, but before her hit "It's in His Kiss".

Track listing

Side 1
"Sideway Shuffle" – March 1974 single
"Old Smokey" – from the Lark album
"We Can Win" – from the Say No More album
"I'm In Love Again" – from the Fathoms Deep album
"Reach For The Truth" – from the Lark album

Side 2
"Rock A Doodle Doo" – June 1973 single
"On The Stage" – from the Fathoms Deep album
"Fathoms Deep" – from the Fathoms Deep album
"Safe And Sound" – b-side of "Sideway Shuffle"
"I Dunno" – from the Say No More album

Credits
Engineer – Ken Scott, Phil McDonald
Producer – Jim Cregan (tracks: A1, A2, A4 to B5)
Lyrics – Linda Lewis

Notes
Tracks A2 and A5 from Lark LP. Tracks A4, B2 and B3 from Fathoms Deep LP.

References
http://www.discogs.com/Linda-Lewis-Heart-Strings/release/2357988
http://www.allmusic.com/album/heart-strings-mw0000852526
original record sleeve notes

1974 albums
Linda Lewis albums
Reprise Records compilation albums